Henry I (died 14 July 982), from the Luitpolding family, was the bishop of Augsburg from 973 to his death. He succeeded Saint Ulrich. A bellicose warrior-bishop, under him the diocese suffered.

Henry aided the rebels against the Otto II, Holy Roman Emperor. In 977, he took part in the War of the Three Henries as one of the three Henries. At an Easter court at Magdeburg in 978, he was imprisoned and remained so until July. After his liberation, he denounced the rebels and remained loyal to the king.

He died in the Battle of Stilo and bequeathed to his church his possessions at Geisenhausen.

References

10th-century bishops in Bavaria
982 deaths
Roman Catholic bishops of Augsburg
German military personnel killed in action
Year of birth unknown